Punk Rock Confidential may refer to:

 Punk Rock Confidential (magazine), a quarterly lifestyle magazine
 Punk Rock Confidential (album), a 1998 album by The Queers